Osório Claudio Bebber, O.F.M. Cap., (11 June 1929 – 13 August 2021) was a Brazilian Roman Catholic prelate. He served as the second Bishop of the Roman Catholic Diocese of Tubarão from 1981 to 1992, the Territorial Prelate of the Roman Catholic Diocese of Coxim from 1992 to 1999, and the second Bishop of the Roman Catholic Diocese of Joaçaba from 1999 until his retirement in April 2003. He remained Bishop Emeritus of Joaçaba until his death in August 2021. 

Bebber was born in Flores da Cunha, Rio Grande do Sul, to parents, Antônio Bebber Filho and Catharina Trentin Bebber. He was born and baptized as Claudino Bebber, but changed his name to Osório Bebber when he entered the Capuchin Province of Rio Grande do Sul's seminary at the age of 12. He was ordained as Catholic priest in 1956.

Bishop Emeritus Osório Bebber died from post-surgical complications, including cardiogenic shock and heart failure, at the Hospital da Unimed in Caxias do Sul on August 13, 2021, at the age of 92.  His funeral was held at the Immaculate Conception Church in Caxias do Sul. Bebber was buried in the Cemetery of the Chapel (Cemitério da Capela) in São Paulo.

References

1929 births
2021 deaths
Roman Catholic bishops of Joaçaba
Roman Catholic bishops of Tubarão
Roman Catholic bishops of Coxim
Brazilian Roman Catholic bishops
Capuchin bishops
Order of Friars Minor Capuchin
Bishops appointed by Pope John Paul II
People from Rio Grande do Sul